Dipple is an unincorporated community in Paris Township, Union County, Ohio, United States. The location of the original community is now wholly located on the Scotts Miracle-Gro Company property.

References 

Unincorporated communities in Union County, Ohio
Unincorporated communities in Ohio